Brian Francis O'Donnell (8 August 1957 – 5 November 2020) was a Scottish professional football player and manager who played as a midfielder.

O'Donnell began his career as an apprentice with AFC Bournemouth. He turned professional with Bristol Rovers in May 1976 before emigrating to Australia, making over 40 appearances for Western Suburbs SC (NSW) before the club was taken over by APIA Leichhardt at the end of the 1978 season.

Blacktown City FC signed O'Donnell from APIA Leichhardt FC for AUD$8,000 in 1979. O'Donnell was only the third player in Blacktown's history to score on his debut in a 3–1 win against Brisbane City, the previous two being Bobby Charlton and Kevin Keegan.

O'Donnell went on to win Player of the Season for Blacktown City FC in successive seasons.

O'Donnell then moved back to the UK and resigned for AFC Bournemouth and made 14 appearances during the 1981-1982 Third Division winning season. He then moved to Torquay United in October 1982 on a free transfer, making his debut at left-back in place of Mark Smith in the 3–1 win at home to Northampton Town on 16 October. He played 19 league games before he returned to Australia to sign for South Melbourne FC.

A torn adductor muscle meant appearances for Footscray F.C. were limited and in February 1986, O'Donnell returned to the UK and joined Bath City. Later, playing for Basingstoke Town, Bashley, Poole Town and Salisbury City.

He was appointed as manager of Bournemouth Sports CMFC in 1993 winning the Dorset Combination League title and Dorset Combination Cup along with notable success in the FA Cup.

In 1999, O'Donnell joined Salisbury F.C. as Reserve team manager before taking over as manager of Bournemouth Poppies in February 2000.

Bournemouth Poppies managed to avoid relegation following O'Donnell's arrival, despite a points deduction placed on the club. In June 2001 amid a mass resignation of the Poppies executive committee, and after steering the club to a comfortable mid-table finish, O'Donnell left and in January the following year took over as manager of Poole Town finishing 5th in the Hampshire Premier League.

However, he left Poole in August 2002.

In 2003, O'Donnell took part in the Marathon des Sables.

He later returned to AFC Bournemouth as their youth coach.

In 2007, it was revealed in the Bournemouth Echo that O'Donnell was acting as a broker for an unnamed businessman in an unsuccessful takeover bid of the AFC Bournemouth. Following a rival takeover, the club went into administration for the second time in their history the following year.

In February 2009 he joined the coaching staff at Dorchester Town as caretaker manager.

Despite an impressive start that drew four points from four games, including a 0–0 draw away to league-topping Basingstoke and with only having nine players signed, O'Donnell was not offered the job full-time and instead the position was given to Roy O'Brien by chairman Eddie Mitchell. O'Brien had been due to walk away from the club prior to being convinced to stay on when O'Donnell took over. O'Brien was subsequently sacked later that year due to a string of poor performances

O'Donnell was appointed Manager of Frome Town in 2013  after working as a Scout for Middlesbrough following similar spells with West Bromwich and Hibernian.

O'Donnell later returned to Dorchester Town F.C. as the Director of Football before having to step down due to ill health.

References

Living people
1957 births
People from Port Glasgow
Footballers from Inverclyde
Scottish footballers
Association football midfielders
National Soccer League (Australia) players
AFC Bournemouth players
Bristol Rovers F.C. players
APIA Leichhardt FC players
Blacktown City FC players
Torquay United F.C. players
Bath City F.C. players
Basingstoke Town F.C. players
Poole Town F.C. players
Salisbury City F.C. players
Bashley F.C. players
Scottish expatriate footballers
Scottish expatriate sportspeople in Australia